Costa Vescovato is a comune (municipality) in the Province of Alessandria in the Italian region Piedmont, located about  southeast of Turin and about  southeast of Alessandria.

Costa Vescovato borders the following municipalities: Avolasca, Carezzano, Castellania Coppi, Cerreto Grue, Montegioco, Paderna, and Villaromagnano.

History 
It was one of the territories subject to the temporal dominion of the Bishops of Tortona, hence the name that literally means "bishop's ridge". Subject, like the whole territory, to the expansionist aims of the Duchy of Milan, it was the scene of jurisdictional conflicts between the bishops and the Spanish government first and then the Savoy government. After the Napoleonic period it became definitively a territory of the Kingdom of Sardinia.

References

Cities and towns in Piedmont